The Maj. James W. McMullin House is a historic residence located in Oskaloosa, Iowa, United States.  McMullin received his commission in the army during the American Civil War. He returned to Oskaloosa after his service where he established a successful transport and livery business that served Mahaska County's coal industry.  McMullin meant for his Queen Anne style home to be a showplace.  It was designed by an unknown architect to be built of brick, but because of price gouging by local brick dealers he chose to have his home built of wood instead.  Structurally, the house has a balloon frame covered with clapboards.  It features an asymmetrical plan, a wrap-around porch, and bay windows.  The interior is noteworthy for its woodwork and exuberant plasterwork.  It was listed on the National Register of Historic Places in 1985.

References

Houses completed in 1882
Oskaloosa, Iowa
Houses in Mahaska County, Iowa
National Register of Historic Places in Mahaska County, Iowa
Houses on the National Register of Historic Places in Iowa
Queen Anne architecture in Iowa